Servicio Geológico Minero is an Argentine government institution aimed at producing geological, mining and enronmental information to achieve sustained development and mitigate geological hazards.

The institution has its origin at the fusion of Dirección General de Minas y Geología and  Comisión de Estudios de Napas de Agua y Yacimientos Carboníferos in 1904. Its first director was Enrique Hermitte who served in the charge until 1922. With Hermitte in charge the institution attracted a number European geologist to work for the institution including Richard Stappenbeck, John Keidel and Walther Penck.

External links
 Servicio Geológico Minero Argentino

References

 
Government agencies of Argentina
National geological agencies
Mining law and governance
Mining in Argentina
Organizations established in 1904
1904 establishments in Argentina